The GP Briek Schotte is a criterium road cycling race held annually around the village of Desselgem in West Flanders, Belgium. The race was first organized in 1941. In 1942 and 1947, two editions were organized, one in July and the other in September. The race is named in honor of Belgian cyclist Briek Schotte, the winner of the first three editions of the race.

Winners

References

Cycle races in Belgium
Recurring sporting events established in 1941
1941 establishments in Belgium